Opsius stactogalus, the tamarix leafhopper, is a species of leafhopper in the family Cicadellidae. It is found in Europe and Africa.

References

Articles created by Qbugbot
Insects described in 1866
Opsiini